Los Chiquillos de la TV ("The little kids of the TV") is an album for children from the TV show "Chiquilladas". It was released on 1982.

Track listing
 Los Chicos de la TV (Todos)
 Amárralo (Lucerito)
 Sobre los Pizarrones (Chuchito)
 Pituka y Petaka (Pituka y Petaka)
 Juan el Descuartizador (Ginny)
 Puras Chiquilladas (Todos)
 El Chico Más Lindo del Mundo (Ginny)
 Ella Es Chispita (Lucerito)
 El Siglo XXX (Pituka y Petaka)
 Niña (Chuchito)

Singers 
 Lucerito
 Chuchito
 Pituka & Petaka
 Ginny

References

1982 albums
Children's music albums